Dato' Choong Ewe Beng  (29 May 1931 – 28 January 2013) was a Malaysian badminton player. He was David Choong's brother and they played men's doubles together.

Early life
Choong Ewe Beng, also known as Eddy, was born on May 29, 1931 and was the third son of a wealthy family in Penang. His parents were named Dato' Choong Eng Hai and Datin Ho Guat Im.

Choong first went to primary and secondary school in Penang before moving to England at the turn of the 1950s to study law and medicine. His passion for the sport quickly eclipsed his studies and Eddy later said his studies were “long forgotten”.

In the UK, Eddie was much attracted to the Jim Russell School of racing driving and enrolled, but parental pressure forced him to re-think his priorities.  However, his passion for driving took him to other aspects of motor sports, and when back on Penang, he revelled in grass track, hill climbs and karting.  He was extremely active in introducing the "Penang Karting Grand Prix" in Georgetown, which attracted karters from all over the Far East.

In 1966, with the All-England men's Singles and Doubles titles being won by Malaysians, an exhibition match was arranged at the Georgetown Chinese Girls' High School, with the pinnacle match being between the then current doubles champions, Ng Boon Bee and Tan Yee Khan, and Tan Aik Huang and Eddie Choong.

Career
Eddy was considered to be one of the first athletes to do a jump smash. His trademark shot was known as the “Airborne Kill”.

He won hundreds of regional titles and over 65 international titles in all three disciplines from 1949 to 1966. Eddy won many of these titles partnering his brother, David Choong, and his cousin, Amy Choong. Thirty of his international titles were gained from 1951 to 1953.

Choong won the men's singles at the All England Open Badminton Championships four times between 1953 and 1957 when it was considered the unofficial world championship of the sport. He also reached the All-England singles final in 1952 and 1955 and won the men's doubles with his brother in 1951, 1952, and 1953. He was a member of the 1955 Malayan Thomas Cup (men's international) team which retained the world team championship, and the 1958 team which surrendered the title to Indonesia

After retirement
Eddy settled in his native Penang for his retirement. After badminton, he bred dogs and raced fast cars and go-karts. He was a good driver and made a name for himself in motor racing after winning many titles from 1967 to 1982. Eddy was also the chairman of the Hock Hin Brothers Group which was his family business in real estate and housing development. Additionally, Eddy was involved at a high level in kennel associations in Malaysia.

In 1995, Eddy became the vice-president of the Penang Badminton Association and chairman of the Badminton Association of Malaysia Technical Advisory Panel. He focused on developing badminton in his native Penang. Choong used his own money to convert a family factory into Penang's first indoor badminton stadium. He later invested 1.5 million MYR to build the Penang International Badminton Hall. It opened in 1992.

Racial issues
Eddy was also a strong promoter of racial equality. Partially due to bad experiences during his childhood, Eddy was sensitive to racial issues. Eddy saw his performances in badminton as a way of showing that all races can be equally good at sport.

At the 1956 All England, he refused to attend the traditional celebration dinner because he felt the organisers treated him unfairly due to racial discrimination. On another occasion, Jørn Skaarup of Denmark gave away a match to Choong in which he felt the Malaysian was treated unfairly. Skaarup earned Choong's respect and friendship with his fair play.

Personal life
In 1959, Eddy married Maggie Thean Sun Lin. Together, they had 4 sons – Finn, Lionel, Antonio and Jorgen. His eldest son, Finn, and third son, Jorgen, were named after Eddy's longtime badminton rivals and friends, Finn Kobero and Jorgen Hamergard Hansan, respectively.

Death
Eddy died on 28 January 2013 at the age of 82 years old.

Awards
In 1994, Eddy won the Herbert Scheele award and was inducted into the IBF Hall of Fame in 1997.

Eddy made such an influence on the game that the IBF named an award after him: The Eddie Choong Player of the Year. This award was given to players who achieved exceptional results during a given year. Peter Gade was the first player to win this award in 1998. In 2008, the award was renamed the Eddie Choong Most Promising Player of the Year and given to the player who showed to be the most promising during a calendar year.

Honours

  :
 Officer of the Order of the Defender of State (D.S.P.N.) – Dato' (1996)

Achievements

Asian Games 
Mixed doubles

International tournaments 
Men's singles

Men's doubles

Mixed doubles

References

Sources
 Eddy Choong - MSN Encarta (Archived 2009-10-31)
 Eddy Choong, Fred Brundle: Badminton. Foyles Handbooks, London, Foyle, 1955
 Eddy Choong, Fred Brundle: The Phoenix Book of Badminton – Its history, the development of the shuttlecock, the diversity of style and tactics, and the badminton world of today, London, Phoenix Sports Books, 1956

1931 births
2013 deaths
People from Penang
Malaysian sportspeople of Chinese descent
Malaysian male badminton players
Asian Games medalists in badminton
Badminton players at the 1966 Asian Games
Sportspeople from Penang
Asian Games silver medalists for Malaysia
Medalists at the 1966 Asian Games